Novruz Srapilevich Temrezov (born on 6 January 1981) is a male freestyle wrestler. Until 2006 he competed for Russia and after that for Azerbaijan. He won bronze medals at the European championships in 2005, 2008 and 2009 and placed seventh at the 2008 Summer Olympics. His brothers Kurman and Tokhtar are also international wrestlers.

References

External links
 

Living people
1981 births
Olympic wrestlers of Azerbaijan
Wrestlers at the 2008 Summer Olympics
Azerbaijani male sport wrestlers
People from Karachay-Cherkessia
20th-century Russian people
21st-century Russian people
21st-century Azerbaijani people